List of radio stations in the Brong-Ahafo region of Ghana in no particular order

List of radio stations

Brong